Warren Stephen Bankston (born July 22, 1947) is a former professional American football player who played ten seasons for the Pittsburgh Steelers and Oakland Raiders in the National Football League (NFL). 

Bankston played at fullback for the Steelers for four seasons: 1969–1972. When the Steelers tried him at tight end in an exhibition game during the 1973 preseason, the Raiders, who needed a tight end, spotted him. They traded for him, and he went to the Raiders at the preseason's end.

During the 1976 season, from which the Raiders went on to Super Bowl XI, Bankston, as team captain, called the coin flip correctly for every game but one. He called it correctly again at the Super Bowl itself, which the Raiders won.  He was very popular with the fans due to his practice of throwing the football into the stands when he scored.

In college, Bankston played for the Tulane University Green Wave. He was quarterback for the Hammond High School (Louisiana) Tornadoes and finished in the Class of 1965. At Hammond High he was elected to the National Honor Society and the Kiwanis-related Key Club, besides lettering in football, basketball, and track during all four years.

Footnotes

1947 births
Living people
American football tight ends
Hammond High School (Louisiana) alumni
Oakland Raiders players
Pittsburgh Steelers players
Players of American football from Baton Rouge, Louisiana
Sportspeople from Hammond, Louisiana
Tulane Green Wave football players